Rygar: The Legendary Adventure, released in Japan as , is an action-adventure game for the PlayStation 2, released in November 2002. It is based on the original Rygar released for arcade and home consoles. It features 3D graphics and a destructible environment. The game is inspired by Greek and Roman mythology and has many enemies and worlds named after them.

It was released to generally positive reviews.

Gameplay
In Rygar: The Legendary Adventure, the player traverses the landscape armed with the Diskarmor, defeating enemies, collecting power-ups, and so forth. The camera is fixed in one location, but rotates accordingly when the player moves around. The game has many unlockable features, like picture and movie galleries.  Completing the game and meeting certain requirements enables the use of a number of special Diskarmors. as well as allowing the player to select any level.

The Diskarmor is a shield that is the main focus of gameplay. The player can equip special stones found throughout the game to increase its power and so forth. Also, abilities can be found that add other functions to the Diskarmor, such as a grapple ability that allows the player to swing between specially marked icons and pull themselves up to otherwise unreachable areas.

Plot
Rygar: The Legendary Adventure takes place on an island in the Mediterranean Sea called Argus. Rygar is about to receive a wreath from Princess Harmonia in a ceremony for a victorious naval battle, when Titans suddenly attack led by Echidna. After she and Icarus capture Harmonia, Echidna has the Minotaur dispose of Rygar with a pit torn open in the ground. Surviving the encounter, Rygar finds the Diskarmor, a legendary shield of the gods and is given task to stop the Titans in order to rescue Harmonia and bring peace to Argus.

Development
Remains from Ancient Greece and the Roman Empire were used as a reference to help design the world. At the start of production, in-house staff members traveled to Greece to look at subject matter. Photographs were taken to help create textures. 3ds Max was used to develop the stages and character models. The character models were then converted into Tecmo's original format and imported into Softimage 3D to animate them. Model textures were edited in Photoshop. The opening movie began production before the game sections.

The Wii version was announced as "Tecmo New Style Action Game" in Famitsu and later as Project Rygar on May 11 at the "Tecmo's Nite Out 07" event.

Music

The music from the game was composed by Takayasu Sodeoka, Riichiro Kuwabara, and Hiroaki Takahashi. The soundtrack for the game includes 27 tracks, including the main theme "Wish", performed by opera singer Isobel Cooper. The song was also available on CD single format, coupled with the karaoke version.

Reception

The initial release of the game on PlayStation 2 was met with very positive reception. GameRankings and Metacritic gave it a score of 82.27% and 83 out of 100. In Japan, Famitsu gave the PS2 version a score of 31 out of 40. It was a runner-up for GameSpots annual "Best Music on PlayStation 2" and "Best Graphics (Artistic) on PlayStation 2" awards, which went to Grand Theft Auto: Vice City and Rez, respectively.

However, the Wii remake of the game, released 6 years later, received average reception, scoring 55.97% and 52 out of 100 on GameRankings and Metacritic. It received a score of 1 out of 5 stars by G4 and won Worst Remake in 2009.

References

External links

2002 video games
Action-adventure games
Hack and slash games
PlayStation 2 games
Tecmo games
Video game reboots
Wii games
Video games set in antiquity
Video games based on Greek mythology
Video games developed in Japan
Rising Star Games games
Single-player video games

ja:アルゴスの戦士